Elections to Liverpool City Council were held on 1 November 1913.

Due to the First World War this was the last contested local election, other than by-elections, until 1 November 1919.

Nineteen of the thirty-six seats were uncontested.

After the election, the composition of the council was:

Election result

Ward results

* - Retiring Councillor seeking re-election

Comparisons are made with the 1910 election results, as the retiring councillors were elected in that year.

Abercromby

Aigburth

Allerton, Childwall and Little Woolton

Anfield

Breckfield

Brunswick

Castle Street

Dingle

Edge Hill

Everton

Exchange

Fairfield

Garston

Granby

Great George

Kensington

Kirkdale

Low Hill

Much Woolton

Netherfield

North Scotland

Old Swan

Prince's Park

Sandhills

St. Anne's

St. Domingo

St. Peter's

Sefton Park East

Sefton Park West

South Scotland

Vauxhall

Walton

Warbreck

Wavertree

Wavertree West

West Derby

Aldermanic Elections

Aldermanic Election 9 November 1913

19 Aldermen were elected by the councillors on 9 November 1913 for a term of six years and assigned to the following wards.

 - re-elected aldermen.

James Heald was nominated by the combined Urban District Councils of Allerton, Childwall and Little Woolton to be Alderman for no. 34 Allerton, Childwall and Little Woolton on 4 November 1913 under Section 3 (1) (a) of the Local Government Board's Provisional Order Confirmation (No. 14) Act 1913. Alderman Heald's term of office was due to expire on 9 November 1916.

Arthur Stanley Mather was nominated by the Much Woolton Urban District Council to be Alderman for No. 35 Much Woolton under Section 3 (1) (b) of the Local Government Board's Provisional Order Confirmation (No. 14) Act 1913.  Alderman Mather's term of office was due to expire on 9 November 1919.

In addition, aldermen who were elected on 9 November 1910 were assigned to the following wards:

Aldermanic Election 1 July 1914

Caused by the resignation of Alderman Edward Purcell (Irish Nationalist, elected as an alderman by the Council on 9 November 1910) which was reported to the Council on 10 June 1914.

In his place Councillor Austin Harford (Irish Nationalist, South Scotland, elected 1 November 1911 was elected as an alderman by the councillors on 1 July 1914.

Aldermanic Election 28 October 1914

Caused by the death of Alderman Thomas Menlove (Conservative, elected as an alderman by the Council on 9 November 1910) on 30 November 1913, Councillor Sir John Sutherland Harmood Banner MP (Conservative, Exchange ward, elected 1 November 1912) was elected by the councillors as an alderman on 28 October 1914 and assigned as returning officer for the Breckfield ward.

By-elections

No. 17 Great George, 27 November 1913

Caused by the election of Councillor William Muirhead JP (Conservative, Great George, elected 1 November 1912) as an alderman by the Council on 9 November 1913.

No. 13 Exchange, 

Following the death of Alderman Thomas Menlove (Conservative, elected as an alderman by the Council on 9 November 1910) on 30 November 1913, Councillor Sir John Sutherland Harmood Banner MP (Conservative, Exchange ward, elected 1 November 1912) was elected by the councillors as an alderman on 28 October 1914 and assigned as returning officer for the Breckfield ward.

No. 8 South Scotland, 14 July 1914

Following the resignation of Alderman Edward Purcell Irish Nationalist, elected as an alderman by the Council on 9 November 1910) which was reported to the Council on 10 June 1914, Councillor Austin Harford (Irish Nationalist, South Scotland, elected 1 November 1911 was elected as an alderman by the Council on 1 July 1914.

See also

 Liverpool City Council
 Liverpool Town Council elections 1835 - 1879
 Liverpool City Council elections 1880–present
 Mayors and Lord Mayors of Liverpool 1207 to present
 History of local government in England

References

1913
1913 English local elections
1910s in Liverpool